Road North is a 2012 Finnish comedy film directed by Mika Kaurismäki.

Cast 
 Vesa-Matti Loiri as Leo Porola
 Samuli Edelmann as Timo Porola
 Peter Franzén as Pertti Paakku
 Krista Kosonen as Elina
 Irina Björklund as Tiia  
 Leena Uotila as Margit
 Eija Vilpas as Birgit
  as Keke
  as Sanni
  as Minna Paakku

References

External links 

2012 comedy films
2012 films
Finnish comedy films